Shangzhou District, formerly Shangxian (or Shang County) and Shangzhou City, is a district of Shangluo, Shaanxi, China.

Shangzhou District governs 30 townships.

Administrative divisions
As 2019, Shangzhou District is divided to 4 subdistricts, 14 towns and 9 others.
Subdistricts

Towns

Others

Climate

References

Districts of Shaanxi
Shangluo